The School of Medical Education is a constituent college under the Centre for Professional and Advanced Studies, established by the Government of Kerala. It was previously run by the Mahatma Gandhi University. It is a self-financing professional college, offering undergraduate and postgraduate courses in the medical and para-medical faculties. It was started at six centres with two centres each at Kottayam and Ernakulam, one centre at Angamaly, one centre at Cheruvandoor, Kottayam. All regional centres are managed by regional directors under the Director of SME. The office of director of SME is at SME main campus in Gandhi Nagar, Kottayam.

The main centre is at Arpookara, Gandhinagar P.O., Kottayam-686 008.

Courses Offered
B.Sc Nursing
B.Sc MLT (Medical Laboratory Technology)
BPT (Bachelor of Physiotherapy)
B.Sc MRT (Medical Radiological Technology
B.Sc Medical Micro Biology 
B.Pharm
B.Pharm (Lateral entry to II year) 
MPT (Master of Physiotherapy
M.Pharm i) Pharmaceutics  ii) Pharmacology 
M.Sc. Medical Bio-Chemistry 
Master of Science (Medical Documentation
Master of Science (Bio-Medical Instrumentation) 
M.Sc  Medical Micro Biology
Master of Hospital Administration  (MHA) 
Master of Public Health (MPH) 
M.Sc Medical Anatomy

Regional centres 
 MG University, Regional Institute of Medical Sciences and Research, Rubber Board P.O., Thalappady, Kottayam-9, ph: 2353152
 MG University, SME, Regional Centre, PKV Buildings, Perumanoor P.O., Thevara, Ernakulam-682 015 
 MG University, SME, Regional Centre, Our Towers, T.D. Road, Ernakulam-682 035
 MG University, SME, Regional Centre;7 Municipal Bldgs., Railway Station Road, Angamaly
 MG University, SME, Regional Centre, Chuttippara, Pathanamthitta-689 645
 Department of Pharmaceutical Sciences, Cheruvandoor, Ettumanoor P.O., Kottayam-686 631
 MG University, SME, Regional Centre, Pala - 686 575
 M.G. University, SME, Regional Centre, Nedumkandam, Idukki.

External links
 MG university
 SME Angamaly group
 Smeangamaly alumni website 
 School of Medical Education website

 |coordinates       = 

Medical colleges in Kerala
Colleges affiliated to Mahatma Gandhi University, Kerala